Jaromír Holan (born May 14, 1941 in Prague) is a Czech former ice dancer who represented Czechoslovakia. Competing in partnership with Jitka Babická, he won bronze at the 1966 European Championships in Bratislava, Czechoslovakia.

By 1968, Holan had teamed up with Dana Novotná. After their marriage, she competed as Dana Holanová. The duo won two national titles and placed 8th at the 1969 World Championships. After retiring from competition, Holan emigrated to the United States and became a skating coach in Ohio.

Competitive highlights

With Holanová (Novotná)

With Babická

Men's singles

References 

1941 births
Living people
Czechoslovak emigrants to the United States
Czechoslovak male single skaters
Czechoslovak male ice dancers
European Figure Skating Championships medalists
Figure skaters from Prague